Joseph Lesniak (July 20, 1890 - July, 1979) was a bishop of the Polish National Catholic Church.  He was consecrated on November 16, 1937, by Franciszek Hodur with the assistance of Bishop Leon Grochowski, Bishop John Zenon Jasinski and John Misiaszek. He retired in September 1953.

References

American bishops
American Old Catholics
Bishops of the Polish National Catholic Church
1890 births
1979 deaths
American people of Polish descent
20th-century American clergy